Met 107 is a radio station of MCOT Public company limited in Bangkok, Thailand.

External links 
 

Radio stations in Thailand
Mass media in Bangkok